Astragalus curtipes is a species of milkvetch known by the common name Morro milkvetch. It is endemic to the Central Coast of California, including the Morro Bay area in San Luis Obispo County.

Description
Morro milkvetch is a clumpy perennial herb with a dense coat of rough, woolly hairs. The gray-green leaves are up to 16 centimeters long and are made up of fuzzy leaflets which are long and narrow in shape. The plant bears a dense inflorescence of up to 35 flowers, each about 1.5 centimeters long. The flowers are cream-colored and sometimes tipped with lilac.

The fruit is an inflated legume pod 2 to 3 centimeters long which dries to a thin, papery texture. Its single chamber contains many seeds.

External links
Jepson Manual Treatment - Astragalus curtipes
The Nature Conservancy
USDA Plants Profile
Astragalus curtipes - Photo gallery

curtipes
Endemic flora of California
Natural history of the California chaparral and woodlands
Natural history of San Luis Obispo County, California
•